Didsbury West is a suburb and electoral ward of Manchester, England. It is represented in Westminster by Jeff Smith MP for Manchester Withington. The 2011 Census recorded a population of 12,455.

Councillors 

 indicates seat up for re-election.
 indicates seat won in by-election.
 indicates councillor changed party.

Elections in the 2020s 
* denotes incumbent councillor seeking re-election.

May 2022

May 2021

Elections in the 2010s

May 2019

May 2018

May 2016 

Leech's win signified the first gain for any party in Manchester other than Labour for the first time in six years and provided Manchester with its first opposition for two years.

May 2015

May 2014

May 2012

May 2011

May 2010

Elections in 2000s

References 

Manchester City Council Wards
Didsbury